Ivy Lillian Campany (23 September 1901 – 19 December 2008) was, at the age of 107, the penultimate World War I female military veteran of any country. The last was Florence Green (1901–2012), who was not identified as a veteran of the conflict until January 2010. This meant that Campany was believed to be the conflict's last surviving female veteran by the time of her death in December 2008.

Born in Hackney, London, Campany joined Queen Mary's Army Auxiliary Corps during World War I and would later serve as a fire watcher in World War II. She lived in Margate, Kent at the time of her death.

References

1901 births
2008 deaths
English centenarians
Queen Mary's Army Auxiliary Corps soldiers
Place of birth missing
Women centenarians